Guglielmo Papaleo (Middletown - September 19, 1922 – November 23, 2006) was an American professional boxer, better known as Willie Pep who held the World Featherweight championship twice between the years of 1942 and 1950.

Papaleo was born in an Italian family: the father Salvatore was from Rosolini, whereas the mother, Maria Marchese, from Melilli.

Pep boxed a total of 1,956 rounds in the 241 bouts during his 26-year career, a considerable number of rounds and bouts even for a fighter of his era. His final record was 229–11–1 with 65 knockouts. Pep, known for his speed, finesse and elusiveness, is considered to be one of the best fighters of the 20th century; after his 199th win, Kid Campeche described his experience by saying, "Fighting Willie Pep is like trying to stomp out a grass fire." Pep was inducted into the International Boxing Hall of Fame in 1990. Pep was voted as the No. 1 featherweight of the 20th century by the Associated Press and ranked the No. 1 featherweight of all-time by the International Boxing Research Organization in 2005. He is currently ranked by BoxRec as the 31st greatest pound-for-pound fighter of all time.

Boxing career

Amateur career
Pep first fought as an amateur in 1937. At the time, amateur boxers from Connecticut were allowed to fight for money. It was during the Great Depression and Pep's father was earning $15 per week at the Works Progress Administration. Pep worked as a shoeshine boy in downtown Hartford alongside Johnny Duke. Both boys joined a gym together and became sparring partners. Willie was soon earning more in one night of fighting each week. When his parents found out he was boxing, his mother was worried for him, but his father said that if he was making so much fighting on Fridays, maybe he should see about fighting on Tuesdays as well. "My old man, he was a sports fan" Pep later quipped.

In 1938 Pep fought Sugar Ray Robinson in the attic of a feed store in Norwich, Connecticut. According to Pep's later telling, Robinson was an amateur champion in the state of New York, where amateurs were not paid, so he took a pseudonym to get bouts for money in Connecticut. Because of this, Pep did not know who he was fighting at the time. Before the fight he was told his unknown opponent was not good, but he recalls quickly learning otherwise once the bout began and Robinson was "all over me".

Professional career
Pep started boxing professionally on July 10, 1940, beating James McGovern by a decision in four rounds in Hartford, Connecticut. Like many boxers of the first half of the 20th century, Pep concentrated his early fighting career on boxing in New England, and he split his first 25 contests between Connecticut and Massachusetts. He was undefeated during that span and for fight number 26, he finally headed west, beating Eddie Flores by a knockout in the first round at Thompsonville, Michigan. A couple of fights later, he travelled further west and made his California debut, beating Billy Spencer by a decision in four rounds at Los Angeles.

By the time Pep stepped up his quality of opposition he was undefeated at 41–0, and he met former world champion Joey Archibald in 1942. He beat Archibald by a decision in ten rounds and, in his next bout, challenged Abe Denner for the New England-area featherweight title. He won the fight by a decision in 12, and his status among the world's top featherweights continued to climb. He won ten more bouts to reach 52–0, including a rematch win over Archibald, before he was given his first world championship try, in October. He became the World Featherweight Champion by outpointing the defending world champ Chalky Wright over the 15 round distance. He fought twice more to finish the year, winning both by knockout.

Pep began 1943 by winning six bouts in a row to find himself with a record of 62–0. But in his seventh bout of 1943, he suffered his first defeat, at the hands of Sammy Angott, another world champion boxer. Angott beat Pep over the ten round distance, by decision. Ten days later, Pep was back in the ring, beating Bobby McIntyre by a decision. He closed 1943 winning five fights in a row, including two over future world champion Sal Bartolo and one over Jackie Wilson. The second win over Bartolo was in a defense of the world title.

1944 was a very good year for Pep. He won all 16 of his bouts that year, including wins over bantamweight champions Willie Joyce and Manuel Ortiz. He fought and beat Wright two more times, with Pep's featherweight title on the line once. He also made his first fight abroad, beating fringe contender Jackie Lemus in Canada.

On June 6, 1944, he fought near featherweight contender, and rated lightweight Julie Kogon before a record crowd of 7,751 in an extraordinary bout in Hartford, Connecticut, and won soundly in an eight-round decision.  Pep was given eight rounds by one of the judges.

He had eight fights in 1945, winning seven and drawing one. He beat former world champion Phil Terranova to retain the title, and had a ten-round draw with Jimmy McAllister.

In 1946, Pep had 18 fights, and won all of them, including a 12-round knockout of Bartolo and a three-round knockout of Wright. He had a six-fight knockout win streak during a span that year.

Despite being severely injured in a plane crash on January 5, Pep fought 10 bouts in 1947, again going undefeated. Many thought he had lost something as a fighter, especially after unexpectedly struggling in fights against Archie Wilmer (Pep won a majority decision) and Pedro Biesca (Pep was floored in the fourth round). He defended the world featherweight belt once that year, knocking out Jock Leslie in twelve rounds at Flint, Michigan.

Nineteen forty-eight was a year that would become important in Pep's life: He won 15 bouts before going into what would be the first fight of his four-fight series with Sandy Saddler. He retained the title by beating Humberto Sierra by a knockout in 10 and he beat former world champion Paddy DeMarco, also in ten, but by decision. Then, on October 29, he lost the world featherweight title to Saddler in a fourth-round knockout.

After two wins, he and Saddler met in 1949. On their rivalry's second installment, Pep recovered the World Featherweight Championship by beating Saddler in a 15-round decision, and then he engaged in a series of exhibition and ten round bouts before defending the crown against Eddie Campo, winning by a knockout in the seventh. He finished that year beating former bantamweight champion Harold Dade by a decision in ten at St. Louis.

In 1950, he won nine fights before meeting Saddler for a third time. Those nine bouts included defenses against Charlie Riley, knocked out in five, and France's Ray Famechon, beaten by decision in 15. Then came the third fight with Saddler. Pep once again lost his World Featherweight Championship to Saddler, being unable to come out for the eighth round due to a separated shoulder suffered at the end of the seventh round. Pep was ahead on all scorecards (5–2, 5–2, 4–2).

Nineteen fifty-one brought a hint of controversy to Pep's life. He won eight bouts in a row to start the year, but his ninth bout, the last chapter of the rivalry with Saddler, was his most important bout that year. Pep quit because blood from his right eye was bothering him. According to Nat Fleischer in The Ring, December 1951, this was an extremely dirty fight, with "wrestling, heeling, eye gouging, tripping, thumbing- in fact every dirty trick known to the old timers..." Referee Ray Miller "let the bout get out of hand..." "The pattern of the 'contest' never varied. Pep wouldn't make a fight of it and Sandy couldn't. Pep too frequently backed around the ring and Saddler just as often missed as he kept boring in trying to corner his man. Then when he did, the rowdy tactics got under way and ended only when either both were sprawled on the canvas still wrestling each other, or the referee was outside the ring trying pull the boys apart or both fighters and official were entangled in a pretzel formation on the ring floor." Pep was ahead on the scorecards of the officials after eight rounds, but he quit after nine rounds, "declaring he no longer could continue because of severe pains caused by a deep cut over the right eye."

In 1952, Pep had 12 fights, winning 11. He was knocked out in six by Tommy Collins, but also held two wins over Billy Lima that year.

Pep won all 11 fights in 1953, and entered 1954 on a 17-fight winning streak. After beating David Seabrooke by a decision, he lost to fringe contender Lulu Perez by TKO after a delayed reaction to a punch. Pep ended up winning three more bouts before the end of the year.

Pep went on boxing for five more years, retiring in 1960, and then he came back in 1964 and boxed for two more years. During that last period of his boxing career, he won 43 bouts and lost only five, but his only opponent of note during that time was Hogan Kid Bassey, a future World Featherweight Champion who knocked Pep out in nine rounds. Pep boxed in Caracas, Venezuela, losing to Sonny Leon by a decision in 10, and in his last fight, in 1966, he lost to Calvin Woodland by a decision in six.

Pep had a record of 229 wins, 11 losses and one draw, with 65 wins by knockout.

Post-career
After retiring, he and Saddler were involved in a series of exhibition bouts, and in 1980, Pep sued Sports Illustrated for running a story suggesting that he threw his fight with Perez. Pep lost the lawsuit, the jury deliberating just 15 minutes.

Pep remained active in boxing after hanging up the gloves, serving as an inspector and referee.

In 1977, Pep was elected to the National Italian American Sports Hall of Fame.

In March 2006, Pep resided at a nursing home in Connecticut, diagnosed with dementia pugilistica, before his death on November 23, 2006. He is buried in Rocky Hill, CT.  He left four children, William "Billy" Papaleo, Mary Papaleo, Michael Papaleo and Melissa Papaleo, and  three stepchildren, April, L.J., Holly Miller.

Honors
In 1945, Pep was voted Fighter of the Year by The Ring magazine.

He was inducted into the International Boxing Hall of Fame in its inaugural year of 1990.

Pep was ranked sixth on Ring Magazine's list of the 80 Best Fighters of the Last 80 Years in 2002. Pep was also named the third greatest fighter of all time by Bert Sugar.

Pep was ranked 5th on ESPN's 50 Greatest Boxers Of All Time list in 2007.

Willie Pep was voted as the Greatest Featherweight Ever by the Houston Boxing Hall Of Fame in 2014. The HBHOF is a voting body composed totally of current and former fighters.

In 2011, the city of Middletown, Connecticut constructed the Willie Pep Skatepark named in honor of Pep.

In 2021, The Featherweight, a feature film based on Pep's life, went into production in Hartford, CT. Directed by Robert Kolodny, the film stars James Madio as Willie Pep and focuses primarily on Pep's 1965 comeback. Lawrence Gilliard Jr. portrays Sandy Saddler, Stephen Lang plays Pep's trainer Bill Gore, Keir Gilchrist is Pep's son Billy, Ron Livingston is Pep's manager Bob Kaplan and Ruby Wolf portrays Pep's young wife Linda. The film is slated to premier in 2023.

"No-punch" round
There are claims that Pep won the third round in his fight against Jackie Graves in a fight on July 25, 1946, without throwing a punch. The "no-punch" winning round is disputed; several contemporary newspaper articles make no mention of it, and an account in The Minneapolis Star describes the third round as "toe to toe slugging with Pep inflicting his best punishment with a right to the body". Pep supposedly tipped off a few ringside reporters before the bout and told them he would win the third round without throwing "a punch of anger."

Professional boxing record

See also
Lineal championship

References

External links

1922 births
2006 deaths
Featherweight boxers
International Boxing Hall of Fame inductees
Deaths from dementia in Connecticut
Deaths from Alzheimer's disease
American people of Italian descent
Sportspeople from Middletown, Connecticut
Boxers from Connecticut
American male boxers
Survivors of aviation accidents or incidents
Sportspeople with chronic traumatic encephalopathy